A limited symptom attack (LSA), also referred to as a limited symptom panic attack (LPA), is a milder, less comprehensive form of panic attack, with fewer than four panic related symptoms being experienced (APA 1994). For example, a sudden episode of intense dizziness or trembling accompanied by fear that something terrible is about to happen. Many people with panic disorder have a mixture of full blown and limited symptom attacks. LSAs often manifest in anxiety disorders, phobias, panic disorder and agoraphobia. However, experiencing an LSA is not necessarily indicative of mental illness. Often persons recovering from or being treated for panic attacks and panic disorder will experience LSAs.

Symptoms 

According to the DSM-IV, during an LSA, fewer than four of the following symptoms would be experienced, in contrast to a full blown panic attack, which must include four or more symptoms.

 dyspnea (shortness of breath)
 heart palpitations
 trembling
 dizziness
 chest pain
 perspiration
 hot flashes
 headache
 derealization
 paresthesia
 hyperventilation
 nausea
 vertigo
 lightheadedness
 burning sensations
 choking sensations
 fear of dying
 fear of insanity

Duration 

As with a panic attack, an LSA typically peaks in 10 minutes. However, attacks can be as short as one to five minutes or can form a series of episodes waxing and waning for a period of hours.

References 

 Anxiety B.C.
 Mind Disorders
 Panic and Anxiety Disorders

Anxiety disorders